Drama Go! Go! Go! (Chinese: 姐姐立正向前走; lit. Older Woman Marching Forward) is a 2012 Chinese television series produced by Ruby Lin and directed by Danny Dun. It stars Ruby Lin, Jiro Wang and Lin Gengxin in the lead roles. The series was first aired on Hunan Satellite TV on 3 November 2012.

Synopsis
As story that centers on the messy, but sweetly satisfying romantic life of 30-year-old female scriptwriter named Wang Ming Ming. During a writer's block, she developed a crush on the lead singer of the no longer popular duo HE, an idol by the name of Eason. On a whim, Ming Ming decides that Eason will be the perfect candidate for the lead role of her drama. Eason and his manager is eager to take it to increase his waning popularity, except that Eason is quite possibly a terrible actor, and pretty soon is in danger of getting written off the drama when the lead actress threatens to quit. To ensure he doesn’t get written off, he starts trying to seduce Ming Ming, hoping that by dating the screenwriter he can stay on the drama.

Cast
 Ruby Lin as Wang Ming Ming
 Jiro Wang as Eason
 Lin Gengxin as Tong Shao Tian
 Maggie Wu as Shen Pei Ni
 Hu Bing as Fu Yun Kai
 Zhang Lun Shuo as Henry
 Hua Yi Han as Ru En
 Wang Yu as Hao De 
 Peter Ho as Ou Yang Cheng
 Wang Li Yin as Ming Ming's mother
 Fu Yan as Lin Yan

Casting
Ruby Lin said she got to pick the actors for the show and wanted to work with people she hadn't worked with before. Lin stated, "I picked Jiro Wang for the main role because he seems to have this natural comedic side to him. I've seen some of his work before and he is not really the Prince Charming type. Rather, he pretends that he is the very hunky type, so it's quite funny. He was perfect for this character."

Soundtrack
 Opening theme song: Our Script (我們的劇本) by Jiro Wang
 Ending theme song: I Should Love You (我應該去愛你) by Jiro Wang
 Dearest Stranger (亲爱的路人) by Rene Liu 
 Answer (解答) by Golden Zhang

International broadcast

References

External links
  Drama Go! Go! Go! official sina weibo
  Drama Go! Go! Go! on Hunan TV
 

2012 Chinese television series debuts
2013 Chinese television series endings
Chinese romantic comedy television series
Mandarin-language television shows
Hunan Television dramas
Television shows written by Ryan Tu